Tormod Haugen (12 May 1945 – 18 October 2008) was a Norwegian writer of children's books and translator. For his "lasting contribution to children's literature" he received the international Hans Christian Andersen Medal in 1990.

Biography
 
Tormod Haugen  grew up in Nybergsund, a small village in Trysil in Hedmark county, Norway. After school graduation at the Hamar Cathedral School in 1965, he attended the University of Oslo.  He worked at the Munch Museum from 1971 to 1973.  He made his debut as a writer in 1973 with Ikke som i fjor (Not like last year). After his debut he wrote a number of children and young people books, and he became one of the more acclaimed writers of children's literature in Scandinavia.

He was an experimental and innovative writer who picked up elements from Norwegian folk tales and myths as well as from international children's literary traditions. A recurring theme in his writing was the lonely child whose feelings and wishes are disregarded by the adult world, and who as a consequence of this winds up in situations that are outside of his control. His books have been sold to 26 countries and translated into 24 languages. He was also an active translator. Among his works, he translated the Narnia books of C. S. Lewis into the Norwegian language.

Awards
The biennial Hans Christian Andersen Award conferred by the International Board on Books for Young People is among the highest recognitions available to a writer or illustrator of children's books. Haugen received the writing award in 1990.

In 1984, he became the first children's author nominated for the Nordic Council Literature Prize. He won the prize of the Nordic School Librarians Association 
in 1986. He was nominated for the Norwegian Booksellers' Prize in 1997 and for the international Astrid Lindgren Memorial Award in 2005.

 1979, Norwegian Critics Prize for Literature
 1979, Deutscher Jugendliteraturpreis
 1980, Gyldendal's Endowment
 1988, Bastian Prize for Children's and Young-Adult Books

Works

1973 – Ikke som i fjor 
1974 – Til sommeren – kanskje 
1975 – Nattfuglene 
1976 – Zeppelin 
1977 – Synnadrøm 
1979 – Joakim 
1980 – Slottet Det Hvite 
1983 – Dagen som forsvant 
1984 – Vinterstedet 
1986 – Romanen om Merkel Hansen og Donna Winter og den store flukten
1988 – Farlig ferd 
1989 – Skriket fra jungelen 
1991 – Øglene kommer 
1992 – Tsarens juveler 
1993 – På sporet av frøken Detektiv 
1996 – Georg og Gloria (og Edvard)
1997 – Hjerte og smerte (og Taj Mahal) 
1998 – Hellou og guddbai (og høstens regn)
1999 – Luftvandreren 
2001 – I lyset fra fullmånen 
2002 – Prinsusse Klura og dragen
2005 – Doris Day og tordnvær

References

1945 births
2008 deaths
Norwegian children's writers
Norwegian Critics Prize for Literature winners
Hans Christian Andersen Award for Writing winners
People from Trysil
University of Oslo alumni
Place of death missing
20th-century Norwegian translators